The Presbyterian Blue Hose football team competes in the National Collegiate Athletic Association (NCAA) Division I Football Championship Subdivision, representing Presbyterian College, located in Clinton, South Carolina. Presbyterian's first football team competed in 1913, and they have fielded a team every year since.

Seasons

References

Presbyterian

Presbyterian Blue Hose football seasons